The 21st FAP Awards were held on March 29, 2003 at the University of the Philippines Theater and they honored the best Filipino films of the year 2002.

The nominations was heavily criticized due to non-nomination of Mga Munting Tinig in the Best Picture despite being the official submission for the 75th Academy Awards.

Lapu-Lapu won most of the awards with seven awards, including the Best Picture. These results were heavily denounced because this film didn't even receive a single award in the 2002 Metro Manila Film Festival and in the other three major film awards: FAMAS Awards, Gawad Urian Awards and Star Awards. The pakikisama system was mostly blamed that these results occurred. This system happens when an academy member only votes for their friends and not on the basis of cinematic accomplishments and craftsmanship. This is one of the triggering factors on why the voting process was reformulated to provide credible results.

Winners and nominees

Notes:

 The complete list of nominations for the Best Musical Score is unknown.
 Coritha was the lone nominee in the Best Original Song.

Special award

Multiple nominations and awards

References

External links
 Official Website of the Film Academy of the Philippines

Luna Awards
2002 film awards
2003 in Philippine cinema